محمد آباد (also Romanized as Moḩammadābād and Mohammadābād) is a village in Sefiddasht, in the Central District of Aran va Bidgol County, Isfahan, Iran. At the 2006 census, its population was 1,903, in 462 families.

References 

Populated places in Aran va Bidgol County